The National Football League playoffs for the 1999 season began on January 8, 2000. The postseason tournament concluded with the St. Louis Rams defeating the Tennessee Titans in Super Bowl XXXIV, 23–16, on January 30, at the Georgia Dome in Atlanta.

These playoffs were notable in that all outdoor games were played with gametime temperatures of 50 °F or higher, making for one of the warmest playoff seasons of all time. It was also the first time since 1969 that no California-based NFL team made the playoffs.

For only the second time during the Super Bowl era, all three Florida-based teams (the Jacksonville Jaguars, Miami Dolphins, and Tampa Bay Buccaneers) made the playoffs—something that did not occur again until the 2022–23 postseason, with the Jaguars and Dolphins facing off in the divisional round. As the Jaguars and Buccaneers advanced to their respective conference championships, the postseason became the closest to having a Super Bowl between teams from Florida.

Participants

Bracket

Schedule
In the United States, ABC broadcast the first two Wild Card games on January 8, and Super Bowl XXXIV. CBS telecast the rest of the AFC playoff games and Fox the rest of the NFC games.

Wild Card playoffs

Saturday, January 8, 2000

AFC: Tennessee Titans 22, Buffalo Bills 16
  

This game is remembered for the controversial "Music City Miracle": Kevin Dyson took a lateral from Frank Wycheck on a kickoff to score the game-winning touchdown with under 15 seconds left.

In the first quarter, the Titans had a big chance to score when Jevon Kearse forced a fumble while sacking Buffalo quarterback Rob Johnson that linebacker Barron Wortham recovered on the Buffalo 29-yard line. It was the start of a long day for Johnson, who ended up completing just 10 of 22 passes while being sacked six times, twice by Kearse. However, Tennessee only gained 3 yards with their next drive and Al Del Greco missed a 43-yard field goal attempt.

Early in the second quarter, Craig Hentrich's 44-yard punt pinned the Bills back at their own 4-yard line. Then on 2nd and 6 from the 8, Kearse sacked Johnson, forcing a fumble that went through the end zone for a safety that gave the Titans a 2-0 lead. After the safety, Derrick Mason returned the free kick 42 yards to the Bills 28-yard line. Five plays later, Tennessee quarterback Steve McNair scored on a 1-yard touchdown run. After several punts, Buffalo got a first down on their own 43 when Kurt Schulz forced and recovered a fumble from Titans running back Eddie George. But the Bills could not gain a first down and had to punt. Then the Titans drove 56 yards in 11 plays. Del Greco initially missed a 45-yard field goal attempt, but the Bills were penalized for defensive holding on the play, and Del Greco's second attempt was good from 40 yards on the last play of the half. At the end of the half, the Bills were trailing 12–0 and had only managed to gain 64 yards, while also losing 44 yards on nine penalties.

But in the second half, the Bills managed to rally back. On Buffalo's first play of the third quarter, Antowain Smith broke off a 44-yard run, sparking a 62-yard drive that ended with his 4-yard touchdown carry, making the score 12-7. Later on, Tennessee drove to the Bills 39-yard line, only to lose the ball due to an interception by Antoine Winfield. With 41 seconds left in the third quarter, a Titans punt gave Buffalo the ball on their own 35-yard line, where they proceeded to drive 65 yards, featuring a 37-yard completion from Johnson to Eric Moulds, with a roughing the passer penalty on Kearse adding another 15. Smith finished the drive with another 4-yard touchdown run, giving the Bills a 13–12 lead after receiver Kevin Williams dropped a pass from Johnson on the two-point conversion attempt.

Late in the fourth quarter, Titans receiver Isaac Byrd's 16-yard punt return to the Bills 45 and five carries from George for 17 yards set up a 36-yard field goal by Del Greco, giving Tennessee a 15–13 lead with 1:38 left. But following a 33-yard kickoff return by Williams, the Bills retook the lead with a 41-yard field goal from Steve Christie at the end of a 38-yard drive that saw Johnson lose a shoe. Stuck in the no-huddle offense in order to beat the clock, Johnson was forced to play without a shoe for most of the drive, but still managed to lead the team into scoring range with two key completions to Peerless Price for 23 yards. Christie's field goal gave the Bills a 16–15 lead with only 16 seconds left in the game.

On the ensuing Christie kickoff, fullback Lorenzo Neal picked up the ball at his own 25-yard line. He then handed off to Wycheck, who ran all the way to the right sideline before lateralling the ball all the way back to Dyson on the left side of the field. After taking the ball, Dyson ran 75 yards for a touchdown to give his team the win. The play was reviewed by referee Phil Luckett, but it was determined that Wycheck's lateral did not travel forward, and the play was upheld.

"We worked on that play yesterday", said Titans coach Jeff Fisher of the winning return. "The play is called Home Run Throwback, it's a play you usually work on Saturdays, the day before a game. That play was designed with Frank Wycheck in the middle to try and put the ball out laterally." However, this was the first time they ran the play with Dyson, who replaced Mason as kick returner when he was injured earlier in the game.

George finished the game with 106 rushing yards. Bills defensive end Bruce Smith had 2.5 sacks. Both teams combined for just 413 total yards (219 for Buffalo, 194 for Tennessee). The game marked the end of an era in Buffalo as it was the final game that Smith, Thurman Thomas and Andre Reed played for the Bills.

The Bills did not make the playoffs again after this game for another 18 years.

This was the third postseason meeting between the Bills and Titans. Buffalo won the prior two meetings when the Titans were the Houston Oilers.

NFC: Washington Redskins 27, Detroit Lions 13

Redskins running back Stephen Davis rushed for 119 yards and two touchdowns in the first half as Washington dominated the Lions, who had barely made the playoffs with an 8–8 record and had lost their last four games of the season. Washington outgained Detroit in rushing yards, 223–45, and recorded five sacks.

Washington took advantage of two key penalties against the Lions on their first drive as they drove 79 yards to score on Davis' 1-yard touchdown run. The first was a running into the punter penalty against linebacker Clint Kriewaldt that enabled them to keep the ball, and the second was a 41-yard pass interference penalty on Lions cornerback Bryant Westbrook. The next time Washington got the ball, they drove 87 yards, featuring a 58-yard run by Davis, and scored with another Davis touchdown run to take a 14–0 lead.

Late in the first quarter, Redskins cornerback Champ Bailey intercepted a pass from Gus Frerotte and returned it five yards to the Lions 39, setting up a 33-yard field goal from Brett Conway. After a punt, running back Brian Mitchell gave the team excellent field position with an 11-yard return to the Lions 49-yard line. Davis then rushed five times for 45 yards, setting up another field goal from Conway that gave the team a 20-0 lead. Davis was knocked out of the game on Washington's next possession, but his replacement, Skip Hicks, rushed for 13 yards and caught two passes for 27 as the Redskins drove 82 yards in eight plays. Brad Johnson finished the drive with a 30-yard touchdown pass to Albert Connell, giving the Redskins a 27–0 lead with 1:19 left in the half.

After a scoreless third quarter, the Lions finally managed to get a touchdown when cornerback Lamar Campbell blocked a 31-yard field goal attempt by Conway and Ron Rice returned the ball 94-yards for a touchdown with 9:23 left in regulation. But after that, they were unable to score again until Frerotte finished a 90-yard drive with a 5-yard touchdown pass to Ron Rivers on the last play of the game.

The Lions, after this game, did not make the playoffs again until the 2011 season. Further, Washington did not host another playoff game until 2012.

This was the third postseason meeting between the Lions and Redskins. Washington had won both prior meetings.

Sunday, January 9, 2000

NFC: Minnesota Vikings 27, Dallas Cowboys 10

Running back Robert Smith helped the Vikings beat the Cowboys by rushing for a team playoff record 140 yards while also catching three passes for 58 yards and a touchdown. The Vikings also got a big performance out of quarterback Jeff George, who threw for 212 yards and three touchdowns, and receiver Randy Moss, who caught five passes for 127 yards and a touchdown. Dallas quarterback Troy Aikman threw for 286 yards and an interception in the final postseason game of his Hall of Fame career. This was also the final postseason game in the Hall of Fame career of running back Emmitt Smith, who rushed for 99 yards, caught a pass for 14 yards, and scored a touchdown. His 99 rushing yards gave him an NFL record postseason total 1,586 yards, surpassing the previous record of 1,556 yards held by Franco Harris. Cowboys receiver Raghib Ismail caught eight passes for 163 yards.

Early in the first quarter, Smith's 65-yard run set up an Eddie Murray field goal. It was the main highlight of the day for Smith, who gained only 30 yards on 14 carries for the rest of the game. Minnesota was forced to punt on their next drive, but returner Deion Sanders muffed the kick and Dwayne Rudd recovered the ball for the Vikings at the Cowboys 30-yard line. Four plays later, Gary Anderson kicked a 47-yard field goal to tie the game. Aikman led the Cowboys back, completing two passes to Ismail for gains of 45 and 25 yards before Smith finished the drive with a 10-yard touchdown run.

In the second quarter, Rudd stripped the ball from Cowboys running back Robert Thomas and safety Anthony Bass recovered the fumble at the Dallas 26-yard line. Faced with third down and 25 on the ensuing possession, George completed a short pass to Smith, who took it 26 yards for a touchdown to tie the game. Later in the quarter, George threw a 58-yard touchdown pass to Moss after a daring 14-yard run by Smith on third down and 12, giving the Vikings a 17–10 lead with 22 seconds left in the half.

Early in the third quarter, Anderson kicked a 38-yard field goal to increase the Vikings lead to 20–10. In the fourth quarter, they drove 67 yards and scored with George's 5-yard touchdown pass to Cris Carter, while the Cowboys lost any chance of a comeback due to two more costly turnovers. First they drove inside the Vikings 20-yard line, but linebacker Ed McDaniel forced a fumble from receiver Jason Tucker right before he could cross the goal line and the ball rolled through the end zone for a touchback. Later on, Dallas drove all the way to the Minnesota 6-yard line, but safety Robert Griffith intercepted a pass intended for Tucker in the end zone.

This was the sixth postseason meeting between the Cowboys and Vikings. Dallas had won four of the previous five meetings.

AFC: Miami Dolphins 20, Seattle Seahawks 17

The Seattle Seahawks played host to their first playoff game since the 1984 season. But they were dominated by the Dolphins defense, who held them to only 171 yards, with just 32 in the second half, and sacked quarterback Jon Kitna six times, three by Trace Armstrong. Although they jumped out to a 17–10 lead in the third quarter, the Dolphins rallied back behind quarterback Dan Marino, who threw for 196 yards and a touchdown, leading his team to their first playoff win on the road since 1972 in what ultimately proved to be the final game played at the Kingdome and the final win of Marino's career.

At the end of the game's opening drive, Seattle punter Jeff Feagles' 35-yard punt pinned the Dolphins back at their own 4-yard line. Three plays later, Seahawks running back Charlie Rogers returned Tom Hutton's 58-yard punt 15 yards to the Miami 47. Kitna then completed a pair of passes to Mike Pritchard for gains of 12 and 17 yards as the team drove to a touchdown on his 9-yard completion to Sean Dawkins. Miami's only score of the first half was a 32-yard field goal from Olindo Mare set up by Brock Marion's 47-yard kickoff return.

In the second quarter, Miami got the ball with good field position when Marion intercepted a pass from Kitna on the Dolphins 41, but this merely resulted in three incompletions and a punt. After a few more drives, a 15-yard facemask penalty against Dolphins defensive lineman Sam Madison turned Ricky Watters' 14-yard run into a 29-yard gain, setting up Todd Peterson's 50-yard field goal with less than a minute left in the half. The Seahawks finished the half leading 10–3, and had limited Miami to just 69 offensive yards.

But Miami took the second half kickoff and nearly doubled their yardage, driving 60 yards in 10 plays, including receptions by O. J. McDuffie for gains of 11 and 27 yards. Marino, who completed only five of eight passes for 28 yards in the first half, completed all six of his passes for 55 yards on the drive and finished it with a 1-yard touchdown pass to Oronde Gadsden. On the ensuing kickoff, Rogers fumbled the ball, then picked it up and returned it 85 yards for a touchdown, giving Seattle a 17–10 lead. After a few punts, Miami drove 32 yards in six plays, aided by two runs by Autry Denson for 28 yards, to set up a 50-yard field goal from Mare, cutting the score to 17–13. After the field goal, the Dolphins recovered an onside kick, but could only advance to their 49-yard line before being forced to punt.

With 9:09 remaining in the fourth quarter, Feagles' 50-yard punt gave the Dolphins the ball on their own 15-yard line. Marino then engineered an 11-play, 85-yard game-winning scoring possession. He completed four of seven passes for 84 yards on the drive, including a 23-yard completion to Tony Martin on third down and 17 from his own 8-yard line, a 20-yard pass to Martin from the Seahawks 49 to the Seahawks 29, and a 24-yard completion to Gadsden at the Seattle 5-yard line on third and 10. Rookie running back J. J. Johnson's 2-yard touchdown run finished the drive with 4:46 left in the game, and the Seahawks could not score again. After being forced to punt, Seattle didn't get the ball back until 1:05 remained, when Hutton's 38-yard punt pinned them on their own 12-yard line. They were only able to reach their 29 before time ran out. This is the last playoff game that the Seahawks played as an AFC member, as they moved to the NFC starting in the 2002 season.

Rogers finished the game with 4 kickoff returns for 159 yards and a touchdown, along with 3 punt returns for 24 yards.

This was the third postseason meeting between the Dolphins and Seahawks. Both teams split the prior two meetings.

Divisional playoffs

Saturday, January 15, 2000

AFC: Jacksonville Jaguars 62, Miami Dolphins 7

The Jaguars shredded the Dolphins with 520 total offensive yards in what became Miami quarterback Dan Marino's last game in the NFL and the most lopsided postseason contest since the Chicago Bears defeated the Redskins 73–0 in the 1940 NFL Championship Game. Their defense forced seven turnovers and held the Dolphins to 131 total yards.

Jacksonville running back Fred Taylor rushed for 135 yards and a touchdown on 18 carries in the first half, while also catching a 39-yard touchdown reception. In the second half, his replacement, James Stewart, added 62 yards on 11 carries. Quarterback Mark Brunell, playing with braces on both knees, completed five of nine passes for 102 yards and two touchdowns before being replaced by Jay Fiedler in the second quarter after the Jaguars scored 38 points in the first 18 minutes. Fiedler completed seven of 11 passes for 172 yards, two touchdowns, and an interception. Receiver Jimmy Smith had the best postseason performance of his career, catching five passes for 136 yards and two touchdowns. Marino completed just 11 of 25 passes for 95 yards and a touchdown, with two interceptions and a fumble that was returned for a touchdown.

On the opening drive of the game, Brunell led the Jaguars 73 yards in nine plays, featuring a 41-yard completion to Smith, and finished the drive with an 8-yard touchdown pass to Smith 4:28 into the game. After the ensuing kickoff, Jacksonville cornerback Aaron Beasley intercepted Marino's first pass of the game and returned it five yards to the Dolphins 41-yard line, setting a 45-yard field goal from Mike Hollis. Following a three-and-out for Miami, Tom Hutton's 57-yard punt pinned the Jaguars back at their own 9-yard line. But two plays later, Taylor took off down the right sideline for an NFL playoff record 90-yard touchdown run. Then on Miami's next possession, defensive end Tony Brackens forced a fumble from Marino and dove on the ball. With most players on both teams thinking he was down by contact, Brackens got up and started celebrating while the Dolphins offense walked off the field, but his teammate Bryce Paup realized that no one had touched Brackens and the play was still ongoing. He ran up to Brackens, shoved him in the back, and told him to start running, and Brackens ended up returning the ball 16 yards for a touchdown.

The situation never got much better for the Dolphins. After another three and out, Jacksonville got the ball back at their own 47-yard line, and they scored another touchdown when Taylor caught a short pass on third down and 14 and took it 39 yards for a touchdown, giving the Jaguars a 31–0 lead just 12 seconds into the second quarter. Then on Miami's next possession, Jaguars rookie Corey Chamblin blocked Hutton's punt and Chris Howard recovered the ball on the Dolphins 21-yard line. Faced with third down and 14 again on their ensuing drive, the Jaguars decided not to pass and Stewart ended up scoring with a 25-yard touchdown run.

Miami continued to turn the ball over through the second quarter. Beasley recorded his second interception from Marino on the Dolphins next possession. Then after a punt, running back Autry Denson fumbled a pitch from Marino, and safety Donovin Darius recovered the ball at the Dolphins 7-yard line. This time, the Jaguars could not take advantage of the turnover. Two plays later, Calvin Jackson intercepted a pass from Fiedler in the end zone. But several plays after the interception, Jacksonville safety Carnell Lake forced and recovered a fumble from J. J. Johnson on the Dolphins 30-yard line, setting up a 30-yard field goal from Hollis with 1:47 left in the second quarter. Marino, who completed only three of 11 passes for 12 yards up to this point, finally managed to respond, completing seven of 12 passes for 79 yards on an 80-yard scoring drive and finishing it off with a 20-yard touchdown pass to Oronde Gadsden with less than 20 seconds left before halftime.

But even so, it was clear by now the game was over, as the Jaguars held a commanding 41–7 lead. Marino was benched in the second half, and his replacement, Damon Huard, completed just five of 16 passes for 46 yards in the rest of the game. Meanwhile, Jacksonville continued to increase their lead. On the third play of the second half, Fiedler threw a 70-yard touchdown pass to Smith. Later on in the third quarter, he threw a 38-yard touchdown pass to Alvis Whitted. And in the final quarter, another fumble from Johnson set up the final points of the game, a 5-yard touchdown run by Howard.

This was the first postseason meeting between the Dolphins and Jaguars.

NFC: Tampa Bay Buccaneers 14, Washington Redskins 13

The Buccaneers forced two key turnovers in the second half to rally from a 13–0 deficit, while their defense held Washington to just 157 yards, with only 32 in the second half. The win sent Tampa to its first NFC Championship Game in 20 years.

After a scoreless first quarter, a 35-yard punt from Mark Royals gave the Redskins great field position on the Tampa Bay 43-yard line. Brad Johnson started out the drive with a 19-yard completion to Albert Connell, and then a 12-yard run by Stephen Davis set up a 28-yard field goal from Brett Conway with 5:37 remaining in the second quarter. Then in the second half, Brian Mitchell returned the opening kickoff 100 yards for a touchdown, a playoff record. Later in the third quarter, Darrell Green intercepted a pass from Buccaneers quarterback Shaun King and returned it 12 yards to the Buccaneers 36-yard line, setting up Conway's second field goal to take a 13–0 lead. But after a Bucs punt, Tampa Bay safety John Lynch intercepted a pass from Johnson on the Tampa Bay 27-yard line. Aided by a 31-yard pass interference penalty on Leomont Evans, the Buccaneers subsequently drove 73 yards in six plays and scored on Mike Alstott's 2-yard touchdown run. Then in the fourth quarter, defensive tackle Steve White forced a fumble from Johnson while sacking him and Warren Sapp recovered the ball on the Redskins 32-yard line. King then went to work, completing a 17-yard pass to Bert Emanuel and a 13-yard pass to Warrick Dunn. On fourth down and 1, Alstott's 5-yard run moved the ball to the Washington 3-yard line, and King eventually finished the drive with a 1-yard touchdown pass to John Davis.

The Redskins had a chance to win the game with a 51-yard field goal attempt in the final seconds of the game, but the snap from center Dan Turk to Johnson, the holder, was off and the Bucs won. (Contrary to popular belief, the snap was not to Matt Turk, the team's punter and Dan's brother.) It was Dan Turk's last game in the NFL, as he died later that year due to cancer. Meanwhile, King became the first rookie to lead his team to a playoff win since Pat Haden in 1976.

This was the first postseason meeting between the Redskins and Buccaneers.

Sunday, January 16, 2000

NFC: St. Louis Rams 49, Minnesota Vikings 37

As expected, this match between the two high powered offenses produced a lot of points (86), and yards (880, 405 by St. Louis, 475 by Minnesota). But after falling behind 17–14, St. Louis stormed to victory with 35 second half points.

Minnesota took the opening kickoff and drove 60 yards in 11 plays, setting up a Gary Anderson field goal. But after the ensuing kickoff, Rams quarterback Kurt Warner on their first play from scrimmage, threw a 77-yard touchdown pass to Isaac Bruce. A 13-yard sack by Rams safety Billy Jenkins on the Vikings ensuing drive forced a punt, and Warner once again went to work. He threw a 26-yard completion to Bruce and an 11-yarder to Torry Holt before finishing the drive with a 41-yard touchdown pass to running back Marshall Faulk. Another sack, this time by linebacker Charlie Clemons, forced Minnesota to punt again, and once again the Rams decided to go deep, but this time the Vikings were ready, and cornerback Jimmy Hitchcock intercepted Warner's pass at his own 4-yard line.

After the interception, Jeff George led the Vikings 96 yards in eight plays, completing passes to Randy Moss and Jake Reed for gains of 24 and 41 yards and finishing the drive with a 22-yard touchdown completion to Cris Carter, cutting the score to 14–10 5:07 into the second quarter. Later on, Rams cornerback Dexter McCleon intercepted a pass from George on the Vikings 41-yard line. But on the next play, Faulk fumbled a handoff and safety Robert Griffith recovered the ball on the 47. After that, Minnesota took the lead by driving 53 yards and scoring on a 4-yard touchdown run from fullback Leroy Hoard with 2:40 left in the half. Aided by Bruce's 22-yard reception, the Rams responded with a drive to the Minnesota 37-yard line, but a 9-yard sack by defensive tackle John Randle pushed St. Louis out of field goal range and the score remained 17–14 by halftime.

The momentum seemed to be in Minnesota's favor, but the Rams suddenly exploded with 35 points in the second half. First, St. Louis receiver Tony Horne returned the second half kickoff 95 yards for a touchdown. The Vikings were forced to punt on their next possession, and Az-Zahir Hakim returned the ball 15 yards with a facemask penalty adding another 5, giving the Rams a first down on Minnesota's 49-yard line. Faulk rushed three times for 14 yards and then Warner completed an 18-yard pass to Roland Williams at the Vikings 14-yard line. After an 8-yard reception from Bruce, Faulk scored on a 1-yard touchdown run, increasing St. Louis' lead to 28–17. The Vikings had to punt again on their next drive, and Warner subsequently led the Rams 62 yards in 11 plays on the way to a 13-yard touchdown pass to tight end Jeff Robinson with 13 seconds left in the third quarter. After the ensuing kickoff, Rams defensive tackle D'Marco Farr recovered a fumbled snap from George on the Vikings 23-yard line. Warner then completed passes to Holt and Hakim for eight and 10 yards, then ran four yards to the 1-yard line. Warner finished the drive with a 1-yard touchdown pass to offensive lineman Ryan Tucker on a tackle-eligible play.

After another Vikings punt, Warner led the Rams 62 yards in eight plays and capped off the drive with a 2-yard touchdown pass to Williams, increasing St. Louis' lead to 49–17 with just over eight minutes left in regulation. George, who completed only two of eight passes for −9 yards in the second half until then, responded with three touchdown passes in the final five minutes of the game. His 42-yard completion to Moss on the ensuing drive set up his 4-yard touchdown pass to Reed. Then Carter recovered an onside kick, and the Vikings scored another touchdown on George's 44-yard pass to Moss. Following a Rams punt, Minnesota drove 85 yards in 16 plays to score on George's 2-yard touchdown toss to Moss, but by then only 35 seconds remained on the clock.

Warner finished his first career playoff game completing 27 of 33 passes for 391 yards, five touchdowns, and an interception. Bruce caught four passes for 133 yards and a touchdown. Hakim rushed for five yards, caught five passes for 49 yards, and returned three punts for 72 yards. Horne set a franchise postseason record with 174 kickoff return yards. Jenkins had 11 tackles and a sack. George completed 29 of 50 passes for 423 yards, four touchdowns, and an interception. Moss caught nine passes for 188 yards and two touchdowns. Carter caught seven passes for 106 yards and a score.

This was the first NFL postseason game ever played in St. Louis.

This was the seventh postseason meeting between the Vikings and Rams. Minnesota previously won five of the prior six meetings while the Rams were in Los Angeles.

AFC: Tennessee Titans 19, Indianapolis Colts 16

Although the Indianapolis Colts, behind second year quarterback Peyton Manning, had posted some gaudy numbers en route to a sterling 13–3 regular season record, the upstart Tennessee Titans paid them little respect. Running back Eddie George rushed for a team playoff-record 162 yards, including a 68-yard touchdown, to help lead the Titans to victory. Manning endured a rough playoff debut as he completed only 19 of 42 passes.

Despite George's impressive day, he actually struggled for most of the first half, gaining only 38 yards on nine carries while kickers Mike Vanderjagt and Al Del Greco spent the first two quarters trading field goals. Indianapolis scored first on their second drive with a 42-yard drive that ended with a 40-yard field goal by Vanderjagt. After a punt from each team, Tennessee drove 46 yards to tie the score on Del Greco's 49-yard field goal on the first play of the second quarter. Following two more punts, Indy put together the longest drive so far from either team, moving the ball 62 yards in seven plays, including Manning's 33-yard completion to receiver E. G. Green, to take a 6-3 lead on Vanderjagt's 40-yard field goal. Derrick Mason returned the ensuing kickoff 47 yards to the Titans' 47-yard line. Two plays later, a 29-yard scramble from quarterback Steve McNair set up Del Greco's 37-yard field goal kick. Manning then completed 5/6 passes for 57 yards and rushed for seven on a 66-yard drive that ended with the team taking a 9-6 lead with Vanderjagt's 34-yard field goal with six seconds left in the first half.

Tennessee's inability to get into the end zone came to an end on just the third play of the third quarter, when George took a handoff from McNair and stormed through the middle of the field for a 68-yard touchdown run. Then after several punts, the Titans put together a 13-play, 73-yard drive, featuring a 26-yard completion from McNair to receiver Chris Sanders. With 12:57 left in the fourth quarter, Del Greco finished the drive with his third field goal, increasing the Tennessee lead to 16–9. Later in the quarter, the Colts had a great opportunity to come back when wide receiver Terrence Wilkins returned a punt 87 yards to the Titans 3-yard line, but it was overruled by a replay challenge from coach Jeff Fisher. Fisher had to burn a timeout to get his challenge heard over the roaring crowd in the RCA Dome, but it paid off, as the replay showed Wilkins had stepped out of bounds at his own 33-yard line during the return.

The lost opportunity was devastating. Indianapolis went three-and-out on their ensuing possession and Mason returned their punt 19 yards to the Colts 42-yard line, setting up Del Greco's fourth field goal to make the score 19–9. The Colts then turned the ball over on downs with their next drive, but managed to get it back with 3:11 left when defensive end Mark Thomas recovered a fumble from George on the Indianapolis 39. The Colts then drove 61 yards in nine plays to score on a 15-yard touchdown run by Manning, but by then there was only 1:50 left in the game and Titans receiver Yancey Thigpen sealed the victory by recovering Vanderjagt's onside kick.

This was the first postseason meeting between the Titans and Colts.

Conference Championships

Sunday, January 23, 2000

AFC: Tennessee Titans 33, Jacksonville Jaguars 14

The Jacksonville Jaguars had been one of the NFL's best teams in the 1999 season, pacing the AFC with a 14–2 record. However, both of those losses came at the hands of their opponents in the AFC Championship Game, the Tennessee Titans. The Titans proved up to the task of beating their division rival once again as the Titans scored a resounding 33–14 victory. The Titans advanced to their first Super Bowl in team history by forcing six turnovers and a safety.

Jacksonville took the opening kickoff and started out strong, gaining 51 yards on their first two plays. First, Mark Brunell completed an 18-yard pass to Jimmy Smith, and then Fred Taylor ran 33 yards to the Titans 13-yard line. Three plays later, Brunell threw a 7-yard touchdown pass to tight end Kyle Brady. But Tennessee struck right back. First, Derrick Mason returned the ensuing kickoff 44 yards to the Titans 49-yard line. Then quarterback Steve McNair completed three passes for 23 yards and rushed for 14 on a 51-yard drive that ended with his 9-yard touchdown pass to Yancey Thigpen.

In the second quarter, the Jaguars drove 72 yards to the Titans 5-yard line, only to have Brunell throw an interception to safety Marcus Robertson in the end zone. But after forcing a punt, they drove 65 yards in four plays and took a 14–7 lead with a 33-yard touchdown run from James Stewart. Tennessee was forced to punt again on their next drive, but Reggie Barlow muffed the kick and Steve Jackson recovered the ball for the Titans on the Jacksonville 19-yard line. After that, Al Del Greco kicked a 34-yard field goal, cutting the score to 14–10 with 20 seconds left in the half.

The Titans defense dominated the second half, forcing four turnovers, while the offense took advantage of key penalties to take control of the game. On Tennessee's first drive of the second half, McNair completed a 15-yard pass to Eddie George at midfield, with a roughing the passer penalty on Tony Brackens adding another 15 yards. Two plays later, cornerback Fernando Bryant committed a 28-yard pass interference penalty while trying to cover Kevin Dyson, moving the ball to the Jaguars 6-yard line. After a 5-yard run by George, McNair scored on a 1-yard touchdown run, giving Tennessee their first lead of the game, 17–14.

On Jacksonville's next drive, Brady lost a fumble while being tackled by Robinson, and defensive tackle Jason Fisk recovered the ball at the Jaguars 35-yard line. McNair subsequently led his team to the 7-yard line, but then linebacker Kevin Hardy stripped the ball away from tight end Frank Wycheck and Lonnie Marts recovered the ball on the 1.

Then Tennessee's defense stepped up. First, linebacker Barron Wortham stuffed Taylor for no gain. Then Josh Evans and Fisk shared a sack on Brunell in the end zone for a safety. After that, Mason returned the free kick 80 yards for a touchdown, giving the Titans a 26–14 lead. Jacksonville reached the Titans 36-yard line on their next drive, but turned the ball over on downs with Brunell's incomplete pass on fourth down and 2.

In the fourth quarter, Brunell lost a fumble while being sacked by Kenny Holmes and Jevon Kearse initially recovered it on the 15-yard line. However, he attempted to lateral the ball to Samari Rolle, who fumbled the pitch, and receiver Keenan McCardell recovered it. But a few plays later, Brunell turned the ball over again when he threw an interception to rookie safety Donald Mitchell at the Titans 39-yard line. On the ensuing drive, McNair ripped off a 51-yard run, then scored on a 1-yard touchdown run to put the game away.

McNair completed 14 of 23 passes for 112 yards, a touchdown, and an interception, and rushed for 91 yards and two touchdowns. Mason returned four kickoffs for 174 yards and two punts for 14 yards. Taylor rushed for 110 yards and caught two passes for 16 yards. This was the Jaguars' last home playoff game until 2017.

This was the first postseason meeting between the Titans and Jaguars.

NFC: St. Louis Rams 11, Tampa Bay Buccaneers 6

In a hard-fought defensive struggle in which both teams combined for only 512 yards and lost a total of five turnovers, Rams quarterback Kurt Warner's 30-yard touchdown pass to Ricky Proehl with 4:44 left in the game was just enough to edge out Tampa Bay.

On the first scrimmage play of the game, Bucs defensive end Steve White intercepted a screen pass from Warner on the Rams 20-yard line, setting up a 25-yard field goal from Martín Gramática. The Rams responded by driving 74 yards in 16 plays with Warner completing seven of 10 passes for 61 yards, including a 22-yard completion to tight end Roland Williams. But on third-and-goal from the Bucs 7-yard line, a fumbled handoff exchange from Warner to Marshall Faulk forced them to settle for a 24-yard field goal by Jeff Wilkins.

The second quarter was full of missed opportunities and poor play from both teams. On the first play, a high snap from Bucs center Tony Mayberry went over quarterback Shaun King's head and into the end zone. King managed to knock the ball out of the end zone to prevent a touchdown, but it gave the Rams a safety and a 5–3 lead. Az-Zahir Hakim returned the free kick 15-yards to the Rams 40-yard line. Hakim also caught a 14-yard pass and ran for six as the team drove to the Bucs 26, but the drive halted there and Wilkins missed a 44-yard field goal attempt. Following a punt from each team, Tampa Bay also got good field position from a 14-yard punt return from Karl Williams that gave them a first down on the Rams 45. Although they drove to the St. Louis 26, they ultimately fared no better than the Rams did. On third down, King lost a fumble while being sacked by Charlie Clemons. King recovered the ball, but the 13-yard loss pushed the team out of field goal range. The next time Tampa Bay had the ball, King threw a pass from the Rams 41 that went right into the arms of St. Louis cornerback Todd Lyght. A few plays later, the half ended with the score still 5–3, despite the Rams' 159–75 advantage over the Buccaneers in total yards.

Just as in the first half, Tampa Bay scored a field goal on their opening drive on the third quarter, set up by a 32-yard reception by Jacquez Green and a 15-yard facemask penalty on Taje Allen. Meanwhile, Warner was intercepted twice by the Buccaneers defense, including a costly interception to Hardy Nickerson on the Tampa Bay 3-yard line. But late in the fourth quarter, Rams cornerback Dré Bly intercepted a pass from King at the Buccaneers 49-yard line. Several plays later, Warner threw a 30-yard touchdown pass to Proehl with 4:44 left, taking an 11–6 lead after the two-point conversion failed. King responded by leading the Bucs deep into St. Louis territory. With 1:25 left, his 22-yard completion to Williams gave the team a first down on the Rams 22-yard line. But on the next play, he was sacked by Grant Wistrom for a 13-yard loss. After that, his potential 11-yard completion to Bert Emanuel was controversially overturned by a replay challenge. (The play led the NFL to adopt the "Bert Emanuel rule" after the season, which still allows for a catch to be ruled if a receiver maintains possession and control of the ball even if the ball touches the ground.) King then threw two consecutive incompletions, turning the ball over on downs.

Proehl was the sole offensive star of the game, finishing with six catches for 100 yards and a touchdown.

En route to attending the game, Kansas City Chiefs star linebacker and future Hall of Famer Derrick Thomas was involved in a car accident in Kansas City that led to his death two weeks later from the injuries he sustained.

This was the second postseason meeting between the Buccaneers and Rams. The Rams won the only prior meeting while in Los Angeles.

Super Bowl XXXIV: St. Louis Rams 23, Tennessee Titans 16

This was the first Super Bowl meeting between the Rams and Titans.

References

External links
1999–2000 NFL playoffs at Pro Football Reference

National Football League playoffs
Playoffs
St. Louis Rams postseason